P Obul Reddy Public School, also known as Durgabai Deshmukh Mahila Sabha P Obul Reddy Public School is a high school affiliated with the Central Board of Secondary Education (CBSE) located in Jubilee Hills, Hyderabad. It was founded in 1989. 

The school is one of the units functioning under Andhra Mahila Sabha, founded by Durgabai Deshmukh in 1937. It is named after her and the organization she founded and after and Nippo Batteries founder P Obul Reddy.

References

External links 
1) Website of DDMS P Obul Reddy Public School
2) http://www.amsporps.org/

2) Notable Student accomplishment 

Educational institutions established in 1989
Schools in Hyderabad, India
1989 establishments in Andhra Pradesh